McGregor High School (MHS) is a public high school located in McGregor, Minnesota, United States. The school colors are black and white and the school mascot is Mercury, the Roman god of speed.

In 1997 it was discovered that the business manager and another employee of the school had been embezzling funds, leaving a deficit of about $550,000. To keep the school open, the community voted to raise property taxes, and in three years' time administrators managed to balance the budget. They also raised money for large building projects including new classrooms and an auditorium.

Notable alumni
 Cheryl Strayed (class of 1986)  American memoirist, novelist, essayist and podcast host

References

External links
 Official site

Public high schools in Minnesota
Schools in Aitkin County, Minnesota
Public middle schools in Minnesota
Public elementary schools in Minnesota